The South Isle of Gletness is an islet off Gletness, in Nesting in east central, Mainland, Shetland. It is 30m at its highest point.

Amongst its features are some caves.

The North Isle of Gletness is nearby.

See also

 List of islands of Scotland

References

 Shetlopedia

Uninhabited islands of Shetland